Aleksei Ivanovich Adzhubei (Алексей Иванович Аджубей  January 9, 1924, USSR – March 19, 1993) was a Soviet journalist who once worked for Komsomolskaya Pravda and Izvestia. He was a member of Supreme Soviet of the Soviet Union and Central Committee of the Communist Party of the Soviet Union. His wife was Rada Khrushchev, the daughter of Nikita Khrushchev, the leader of Soviet Union. In November 25, 1961, he interviewed John F. Kennedy at Hyannis Port, Massachusetts.

References

1924 births
1993 deaths
Soviet journalists
Russian memoirists
People from Samarkand
Soviet propagandists
Khrushchev family
Moscow State University alumni
Moscow Art Theatre School alumni
Central Committee of the Communist Party of the Soviet Union members
Fifth convocation members of the Supreme Soviet of the Soviet Union
Sixth convocation members of the Supreme Soviet of the Soviet Union
Lenin Prize winners
Burials at Vvedenskoye Cemetery